Billy Barnes may refer to:
 Billy Barnes (composer) (1927–2012), American composer
 Billy Barnes (cricketer) (1852–1899), English cricketer
 Billy Barnes (footballer) (1879–1962), English footballer
 Billy Ray Barnes (born 1935), former professional American football player and coach

See also
 William Barnes (disambiguation)